The 1924 All-Ireland Senior Football Championship was the 38th staging of Ireland's premier Gaelic football knock-out competition. Dublin entered the championship as the defending champions but failed to win 4 in a row until 2018. Kerry were the winners.

Results

Connacht Senior Football Championship

An objection was made and a replay ordered.

Leinster Senior Football Championship

Munster Senior Football Championship

Ulster Senior Football Championship

An objection was made and a replay ordered.

All-Ireland Senior Football Championship

Championship statistics

Miscellaneous

 There was a six-week gap between the drawn and replay of the Leinster final between Dublin and Wexford. And the Ulster final between Cavan and Monaghan.
 Kerry stopped Dublin to winning a might have been a 4th All Ireland title in a row in the All Ireland final.

References

All-Ireland Senior Football Championship